"The More I See You" is a popular song composed by Harry Warren, with lyrics by Mack Gordon. The song was first published in 1945.

Other recordings
"The More I See You" has been subsequently recorded by many artists, notably by: 
 Bing Crosby recorded a version of the song on his 1977 album Beautiful Memories.
 Chet Baker sings the song on his 1958 LP (Chet Baker Sings) It Could Happen to You.
In 1966, Chris Montez released the most commercially successful and well-known recording of the song, his version went to number sixteen on the Billboard Hot 100 and spent four weeks at number two on the Easy Listening chart. It also went to number three on the UK Singles Chart.
Nancy Sinatra recorded a version of the song on her 1966 album Nancy in London.
Andy Williams recorded a version of the song on his 1967 album Love, Andy.
Joy Marshall recorded a version in 1966
Ella Fitzgerald recorded a live version in 1967, accompanied by the Jimmy Jones Trio, which was released on Ella and Duke at the Cote D'azur.
Peter Allen recorded a version of the song on his 1976 album Taught by Experts.
Orchestral Manoeuvres in the Dark recorded a version of the song on their 1980 album Organisation.

Popular culture
The song was originally sung by Dick Haymes in the 1945 film Diamond Horseshoe.
The Chris Montez version has been used many times in films, notably at the beginning of the club scene in Roman Polanski's Frantic, starring Harrison Ford.

References

External links
 [ Review of the Chris Montez version by Joe Viglione] at AllMusic

1945 songs
Songs with music by Harry Warren
Songs with lyrics by Mack Gordon
Nancy Wilson (jazz singer) songs
Nina Simone songs
Carmen McRae songs
Chris Montez songs
Orchestral Manoeuvres in the Dark songs
Andy Williams songs
Songs written for films